Al-Ameen College, Edathala, is a minority general degree college located in Edathala, Kerala. It was established in the year 1981. The college is affiliated with Mahatma Gandhi University. This college offers different courses in arts, commerce and science.

Departments

Science

Physics
Chemistry (petrochemical)
Mathematics
Computer Science
Biotechnology

Arts and Commerce

Malayalam
English literature and communication studies
Hindi
Arbic
Economics
Physical education
Tourism
Commerce (computer and tax)

Accreditation
The college is  recognized by the University Grants Commission (UGC).

Notable alumni
 Manoj Guinness, Actor

References

External links
http://www.alameencollege.org/index.php

Universities and colleges in Ernakulam district
Educational institutions established in 1981
1981 establishments in Kerala
Arts and Science colleges in Kerala
Colleges affiliated to Mahatma Gandhi University, Kerala